Marco Formentini (14 April 1930 – 2 January 2021) was an Italian politician from the Northern League, then for the Democrats and finally for The Daisy. During his youth, he was a member of the Italian Socialist Party.

After being a member first of the Italian (1992–1993), and then the European Parliament (1994–2004), he was mayor of Milan from 1993 to 1997. Elected for the second time to the European Parliament in 1999, he switched to Romano Prodi's Democrats soon after the election.

Electoral history

References

1930 births
2021 deaths
Mayors of Milan
Lega Nord MEPs
Democracy is Freedom – The Daisy MEPs
MEPs for Italy 1999–2004
MEPs for Italy 1994–1999